Wooster is the county seat of Wayne County, Ohio, United States. The population was 27,232 at the 2020 census. It is the largest in Wayne County, and the center of the Wooster micropolitan area. Wooster has the main branch and administrative offices of the Wayne County Public Library, and is home to the private College of Wooster. fDi magazine ranked Wooster among North America's top 10 micro cities for business friendliness and strategy in 2013.

History
Wooster was established in 1808 by John Bever, William Henry, and Joseph Larwill and named after David Wooster, a general in the American Revolutionary War.

Geography

Geology
The local bedrock consists of the Cuyahoga Formation (shale) and the overlying Logan Formation (sandstone and conglomerate), both Lower Carboniferous and rich in fossils.

Demographics

In 2011, 93.3% spoke English, 2.4% Spanish, and 1.3% German.

2010 census

As of the census of 2010, there were 26,119 people, 10,733 households, and 6,244 families residing in the city. The racial makeup of the city was 91.2% White, 3.6% African American, 0.3% Native American, 1.9% Asian, 0.7% from other races, and 2.4% from two or more races. Hispanic or Latino of any race were 2.2% of the population.

There were 10,733 households, of which 26.5% had children under the age of 18 living with them, 43.1% were married couples living together, 11.3% had a female householder with no husband present, 3.8% had a male householder with no wife present, and 41.8% were non-families. 35.4% of all households were made up of individuals, and 14.2% had someone living alone who was 65 years of age or older. The average household size was 2.21 and the average family size was 2.86.

The median age in the city was 37.3 years. 20.4% of residents were under the age of 18; 14.8% were between the ages of 18 and 24; 23.1% were from 25 to 44; 25.1% were from 45 to 64; and 16.6% were 65 years of age or older. The gender makeup of the city was 47.6% male and 52.4% female.

2000 census
As of the census of 2000, there were 24,811 people, 10,040 households, and 6,174 families residing in the city. The population density was 1,726.1 people per square mile (666.6/km2). There were 10,674 housing units at an average density of 742.6 per square mile (286.8/km2). The racial makeup of the city was 92.59% White, 3.82% African American, 0.26% Native American, 1.54% Asian, 0.01% Pacific Islander, 0.36% from other races, and 1.42% from two or more races. Hispanic or Latino of any race were 1.07% of the population.

There were 10,040 households, out of which 28.4% had children under the age of 18 living with them, 46.9% were married couples living together, 11.2% had a female householder with no husband present, and 38.5% were non-families. 32.4% of all households were made up of individuals, and 11.7% had someone living alone who was 65 years of age or older. The average household size was 2.28 and the average family size was 2.88.

In the city, the population was spread out, with 22.0% under the age of 18, 14.9% from 18 to 24, 25.9% from 25 to 44, 22.4% from 45 to 64, and 14.8% who were 65 years of age or older. The median age was 36 years. For every 100 females, there were 91.3 males. For every 100 females age 18 and over, there were 88.3 males.

The median income for a household in the city was $37,400, and the median income for a family was $47,118. Males had a median income of $34,021 versus $23,608 for females. The per capita income for the city was $21,505. About 7.8% of families and 10.4% of the population were below the poverty line, including 14.5% of those under age 18 and 8.0% of those age 65 or over.

Economy
Wooster is the headquarters of several industrial entities. Buehler Food Markets Inc.,  Wooster Brush, Seaman Corp., Tricor Industrial, CRW Inc, and Certified Angus Beef have corporate headquarters located in Wooster. Rubbermaid made its corporate headquarters in Wooster until the end of 2003. LuK, the German maker of dual-clutch transmissions has its North America headquarters in Wooster where mainly torque converters are produced. Other large commercial operations in Wooster are Frito-Lay, Akron Brass, United Titanium, Western Reserve Group Insurance Company, Daisy Brands, and Bogner Construction Company.

For its size, Wooster is also dedicated to the "industry of education."  It has the College of Wooster, and two subsidiaries of Ohio State University:  the Agricultural Technical Institute (ATI); and the Ohio Agricultural Research and Development Center (OARDC), a teaching and research facility dedicated to agricultural science.

In addition to these industries, Wooster remains an agricultural center for Ohio.  The OARDC enriches the local farms with knowledge and expertise, which is proudly displayed at the annual Wayne County Fair, held each September (see also Fair).  Students in Wooster and surrounding rural communities continue to enroll in youth farming programs such as 4-H and National FFA Organization.  Many Amish farmers come to Wooster by horse-and-buggy for commerce as well. In June 2013, the city of Wooster announced that Daisy Brand, a sour cream producer, plans to open a new Midwest manufacturing plant in Wooster. Daisy Brand promised to create at least 89 full-time positions and is slated to begin production sometime in 2016.

The overlap of strong education and advanced manufacturing has led to number of small innovative firms being founded in Wooster in recent years including Quasar Energy Group, ExpenseWire, ABS Materials, 3i-ingredients, and Cureo. Wooster also has a local food community including Local Roots, a collective year round farmer's market for locally produced goods. At present, there are over 150 local farmers and producers. Local Roots has garnered national attention for its innovative efforts.

Arts and culture
Wooster, and the greater Wayne County community, is served by the Wayne Center for the Arts, which displays artwork by local artists, offers instructional courses, and stages performances.

The College of Wooster is home to the Ohio Light Opera, a professional opera company  that performs the light opera repertory, including Gilbert and Sullivan, and American, British, and continental operettas of the late 19th and early 20th centuries.

The Wooster Symphony Orchestra, founded in 1915, is a joint venture between the Wooster community and the College of Wooster. The Symphony is the second oldest continually performing in the state.

Points of interest

 The College of Wooster
 Ohio Agricultural Research and Development Center
 Ohio Light Opera
 Ohio State University Agricultural Technical Institute
 Secrest Arboretum
 Wayne County Fair
 Wayne County Public Library

Sports
For the 2007–2008 season, Wooster was granted a team in the Mid-Atlantic Hockey League called the Wooster Warriors. The MAHL suspended operations of February 2008, and the Warriors subsequently relocated to Trenton, Michigan.

Wooster was the home to the Wooster Korn Kings, which was a minor league professional ice hockey team that was a member of the All American Hockey League.  The team's home arena was Alice Noble Ice Arena.

The Wooster Oilers began playing at the Alice Noble Ice Arena in 2006. The team competes in the North American 3 Hockey League, and won the 2009–2010 championship. The team moves players to higher levels of junior or college hockey.

Parks and recreation
Wooster Memorial Park, locally known as Spangler Park, contains  of hiking trails through woods, ravines, and open fields along the Rathburn Run.  Christmas Run Park has playgrounds, pavilions, and a picnic area.  Schellin Park has a skate park, playground and picnic facilities. Oak Hill Park has pavilions and paved walking trails. Freedlander park has the pool, basketball courts, pavilions, and a pond as well. 

Acres of Fun is a local entertainment complex which offers family activities like go-karting and laser tag. The College of Wooster has a golf course, bowling alley, and multipurpose athletic facility open to the public. Also located in the city is Wooster Skateland, an indoor ice skating and hockey facility open year-round.

Government

Mayor and council
The city is governed by an elected mayor. On January 1, 2008, former Councilman Bob Breneman (R) was sworn in as Mayor.

There is a seven-member City Council: Mark Cavin (D-1st Ward), Jennifer Warden (D-2nd Ward), David Silvestri (R-3rd Ward), Scott Myers (I-4th Ward), and at-large members Bill Bostansic (D), Jon Ansel (R) and Craig Sanders (R). Meetings are presided over by Mike Buytendyk (R) the City Council president who is elected at-large and only votes to break a tie. Jon Ansel is the council president pro tempore.

Elected representatives
As of 2023, the city is represented in the Ohio House of Representatives by Scott Wiggam (R); in the Ohio Senate by Kristina Roegner (R); in the U.S. House of Representatives by Max Miller (R), and in the U.S Senate by Sherrod Brown (D) and J. D. Vance (R).

Media

Newspapers

The city has a daily newspaper, The Daily Record, previously published by Dix Communications/Wooster Republican Printing Co. Currently published by Gannett, and a weekly paper, The Wooster Weekly News, published by Graphic Publications Inc. In addition, the Akron Beacon Journal occasionally covers the city and Wayne County. Students of Wooster High School publish a bi-weekly student run publication, The Wooster Blade.

Magazines
The city has a locally owned interactive city magazine, WoosterGrapevine.com.  It includes local news, events, classifieds, arcades, photos, videos, and other local information.

Transportation
U.S. Route 30 and U.S. Route 250, as well as Ohio State Route 3 and Ohio State Route 83, run through the center of the city.

The Wayne County Airport (BJJ) serves as an air access point for many of the businesses throughout the city. The Akron-Canton Airport is the nearest commercial airport with scheduled passenger flights.

Prior to Amtrak's establishment the Penn Central ran the daily Manhattan Limited (Chicago - Pittsburgh - New York City) through Wooster.

Notable people
The following individuals were born in, raised in, lived in, or currently live in Wooster.

 Dan Auerbach (born 1979), musician, vocalist and guitarist
 Jon Belmont (born 1952), radio newscaster, ABC New York, and Associated Press Washington D.C.
 David Berman (musician) (1967-2019), musician best known for Silver Jews and Purple Mountains.
 Lori Bettison-Varga (born 1962), geologist, president of the Los Angeles Museum of Natural History
 Marquise Blair, NFL-player for the Seattle Seahawks
 US Representative George Bliss (1813–1868),  attorney, judge, politician.
 Vince Cellini (born 1959),  broadcaster, sports journalist.
 Dean Chance (1941-2015),  Major League Baseball pitcher, 1964 Cy Young Award winner.
 William Estabrook Chancellor (1867–1963),  author, professor of history.
 Martha Chase (1927–2003),  biologist, geneticist, professor.
 Clarence Childs (1883–1960), 1912 Olympic bronze medalist in hammer throw, college football coach
 Ginger Clark (1879–1943),  Major League Baseball player.
 Arthur Compton (1892–1962),  physicist, Nobel Laureate.
 Karl Compton (1887–1954),  physicist.
 Hal Dean (1922–2011),  professional football player.
 John Dean (born 1938),  attorney, politician, banker; White House Counsel to Richard Nixon.
 Edward Fenwick (1768–1832),  priest, college founder, missionary.
 David Fishelson (born 1956),  theatre, film and television producer and playwright.
 Charles Follis (1879–1910),  first African-American to play professional football.
 Hollis Frampton (1936–1984),  avant-garde filmmaker, photographer, writer/theoretician, and pioneer of digital art.
 Elizebeth Friedman (1892–1980),  cryptographer, student of languages and literature.
 William H. Gass (born 1924),  author, educator.
 Stanley Gault (1926-2016), CEO and chairman, Rubbermaid, Inc.; CEO and Board Chairman, Goodyear Tire and Rubber Company.
 Richard Gibbs,  musician.
 Guy Hecker (1856–1938),  Major League Baseball player.
 Sarah Hider (born 1991), Miss Ohio 2015.
 August Imgard (1828-1904), German immigrant once credited with introducing the Christmas tree to the U.S.
 Philip Jameson (born 1941), professor of trombone and music at the University of Georgia
 Duncan Jones,  film director, son of Hall of Fame rock musician David Bowie.
 Josh Krajcik (born 1981), musician, finalist on The X Factor.
 Jack Lengyel,  software executive, football coach.
 Roscoe C. McCulloch (1880–1958),  attorney, politician.
 George Morgan (1924–1975),  country music singer.
 Bill Musselman (1940–2000),  basketball coach in NCAA, ABA, WBA, CBA and NBA.
 Roger Peckinpaugh (1891–1977),  Major League Baseball player and manager.
 Jack Perkins (born 1933),  journalist.
 Bob Peterson (born 1961),  animator for Pixar.
 Joseph Banks Rhine (1895–1980),  psychologist, professor of parapsychology.
 Dick Schafrath (1937-2021), professional football player.
 John Sloane (1779–1856), Ohio Secretary of State (1841–1844), U.S. House of Representatives (1819–1829), Treasurer of The United States (1850–1853).
 James Stuart,  founder of Ohio Light Opera, musician, singer, professor of music.
 Lynn St. John (1876–1950),  athlete, basketball coach.
 Tyrell Sutton (born 1986), football player.
 Oris Paxton Van Sweringen and Mantis James Van Sweringen  (1879–1936 and 1881–1934, respectively),  businessmen, railroad tycoons.
 Billy Uhl (born 1950), motorcycle enduro competitor and five-time gold medal winner in the International Six Day Trials.
 Hal Varian (born 1947), economist specializing in microeconomics and information economics; Chief Economist at Google.
 John T. Walton (1946–2005),  businessman, soldier, philanthropist, son of Wal-Mart founder, Sam Walton.
 Sidney Abram Weltmer (1858-1930), author and founder of the Weltmer Institute of Suggestive Therapeutics.
 Kaiser Wilhelm (1874–1936),  Major League Baseball player.
 John Howard Yoder (1927–1997),  Christian (Mennonite) theologian, author, pacifist.
 Carl V. Weygandt (1988-1964), Chief Justice of the Ohio Supreme Court from 1933-1962.

Sister cities
Wooster has one sister city:

 Collepietro, Abruzzi, Italy

See also
 Wooster Nagar, a fishing village in India named after Wooster, whose residents funded the construction of houses there

References

External links

 City of Wooster
 Wooster Chamber of Commerce
 
 
 

County seats in Ohio
Cities in Wayne County, Ohio
Populated places established in 1808
English-American culture in Ohio
Cities in Ohio